Ardenno is a comune (municipality) in the Province of Sondrio in the Italian region Lombardy, located about  northeast of Milan and about  west of Sondrio.

The municipality of Ardenno contains the frazioni (subdivisions, mainly villages and hamlets) Pioda, Biolo, Gaggio, Scheneno, Piazzalunga and Pilasco .

Ardenno borders the following municipalities: Buglio in Monte, Civo, Dazio, Forcola, Talamona, Val Masino.

Notable people
 

Riccardo Innocenti (born 1943), footballer

References

External links
 Official website
 Photos (by Massimo Dei Cas)

Cities and towns in Lombardy
Articles which contain graphical timelines